Discovery Museum is a hands-on museum for families that blends science, nature, and play, located in Acton, Massachusetts, United States. The museum was originally founded in 1982.

Description
Originally founded in 1982 and expanded to two museums in 1987, the museum reopened  in a single, accessible building after a complete renovation and expansion in early 2018. Discovery Woods, opened on the campus in July 2016, abuts  of conservation land on Great Hill used for visitor programs.

History
The original Children's Discovery Museum was founded in 1982 by Donald B. Verger, a math teacher and naturalist. The Science Discovery Museum was added to the campus in 1988. An additional parcel that increased the campus size by half was purchased and a new master plan was commissioned in 2008.

Current exhibits
The museum has twice the exhibit space of the original museum and includes significant galleries for STEAM experiences including water; air; tinkering, design, and engineering; early brain development; math; light and color; and sound. It also includes re-imagined visitor favorites from the original buildings including a Diner, Train Room, and Ship Room, along with other beloved exhibit components such as a giant amethyst and radar magnet. All exhibits are hands-on, low-tech, open-ended, and interactive, to encourage play, exploration, and experimentation by all.

Accessibility
The building is ADA-compliant and all exhibits are accessible, designed according to Universal Design principles to be both aesthetically pleasing and usable by the widest possible range of people, without regards to age or ability. In combination with the museum’s Discovery Woods outdoor nature playscape and treehouse, the entire campus is accessible. 

The Museum's Open Door Connections program provides opportunities for those who face a variety of barriers—financial, developmental, or cultural—to experience the museum. In 2018, 22% of the total served visited for free or nearly free. The Museum provides dedicated free services for families with children on the autism spectrum and with vision or hearing loss; free admission to all on select Friday nights, and any time to military families; and $1 admission to EBT card holders and up to five guests.

Awards and honors
 John F. Kennedy Center for the Performing Arts LEAD Community Asset Award, 2018
 Boston magazine’s Best of Boston 2018, Best Family-Friendly Museum, West
 New England Museum Association (NEMA) Excellence Award, 2015, 2018
 Massachusetts Commonwealth Award (Access Category), Massachusetts Cultural Council, 2017
 Best Museum, Gold or Silver, Wicked Local Reader’s Choice Awards, 2010-2018
 “Best of the Best” Family Favorites Award, Boston Parents Paper; 2010-2018
 Trip Advisor Certificate of Excellence, 2017
 Museums for America grant, Institute of Museum and Library Services, 2011, 2013-15, 2017

Original buildings (now closed)
The original Children's Discovery Museum was housed in a 3-story Victorian house, built in 1880, that had  of floor space in ten rooms. The former Science Discovery Museum was housed in a purpose-built postmodern building designed by E. Verner Johnson & Associates. It had  of floor space. It is this structure that was completely renovated and expanded in 2018; the original Children's Discovery Museum building remains on campus but is used for office space and is closed to the public.

Former exhibits
The former Children's Discovery Museum exhibits included the Assabet River Water Table, Bessie's Play Diner, Air Play, Backyard at Night, Sensations, S.S. Discover, the Chain Reaction Room, the Adventure fort, and the Train Room. Former exhibits include the Rainbow Room, Safari Room, Dinosaur Room, and Grandma's Attic.

The former Science Discovery Museum permanent exhibits included Earth Science, Inventor's Workshop, Rubber Ball Music Wall, and Sea of Clouds.

CEO
Neil H. Gordon (2009-present)

Current and Former Directors
Donald Verger
Kathleen Compton
Deborah Gilpin (1992-2003)
Michael W. Judd
Patricia J. Chisholm
Wendy E. Baker
Donald MacKenzie
Russell Layton
Katharine Denault
Margaret (Meg) Ramsey
Cheryl Beaudoin
Justin Kliger
Helen Crary
Jeff Glidden
Kerry Hawitt, Ph.D
Andrew H. Howard

References

External links
Discovery Museum

Children's museums in Massachusetts
Museums established in 1982
Victorian architecture in Massachusetts
Postmodern architecture in the United States
Museums in Middlesex County, Massachusetts
Science museums in Massachusetts
1982 establishments in Massachusetts
Acton, Massachusetts